Assenmacher is a surname. Notable people with the surname include:

Paul Assenmacher (born 1960), American baseball pitcher 
Joachim Assenmacher (born 1963), West German long jumper 
Karl-Josef Assenmacher (born 1947), German football referee

See also
Assenmacher bicycles, Flint, Michigan (USA)

German-language surnames